The Norwegian Directorate of Elections is a government agency subordinate the Ministry of Local Government and Regional Development. An election commission, it is responsible for coordinating and managing national and local elections in Norway. The operative aspects of the election are conducted by the municipalities.

The agency is located in Tønsberg, where it shares premises with the Norwegian Directorate for Civil Protection. The first election it oversaw were the jointly held 2017 Norwegian parliamentary election and the 2017 Norwegian Sámi parliamentary election on 11 September 2017.

References

Election commissions
Elections in Norway
Organisations based in Tønsberg
2016 establishments in Norway
Government agencies established in 2016